Piedrabuena may refer to:

 Piedrabuena, a municipality in Ciudad Real, Castile-La Mancha, Spain
 Luis Piedrabuena (1833-1883), an Argentine Navy commander and lifeboat captain 
 Comandante Luis Piedrabuena, a town in Santa Cruz Province, Argentina
 Piedrabuena Bay, a site in the Filchner Ice Shelf where the Argentine base Belgrano I was located, until 1980
 ARA Piedrabuena (D-29), an Argentine Navy destroyer of the 1970s and 1980s, (formerly USS Collett, an Allen M. Sumner class destroyer)